The 2015 Franken Challenge was a professional tennis tournament played on clay courts. It was the 28th edition of the tournament which was part of the 2015 ATP Challenger Tour. It took place in Fürth, Germany between 1 and 7 June 2015.

Singles main-draw entrants

Seeds

 1 Rankings are as of May 25, 2015.

Other entrants
The following players received wildcards into the singles main draw:
  Daniel Brands
  Johannes Härteis
  Maximilian Marterer
  Florian Mayer

The following players received entry as an alternate into the singles main draw:
  Frank Dancevic

The following players received entry from the qualifying draw:
  Gonzalo Escobar
  Lorenzo Giustino
  Kevin Krawietz
  Jordi Samper-Montaña

Doubles main-draw entrants

Seeds

 1 Rankings are as of May 25, 2015.

Other entrants
The following pairs received wildcards into the doubles main draw:
  Kevin Krawietz /  Maximilian Marterer
  Steven Moneke /  Peter Torebko

The following players received entry as an alternate into the singles main draw:
  Marcelo Arévalo /  Gonzalo Escobar

Champions

Singles

  Taro Daniel def.  Albert Montañés, 6–3, 6–0

Doubles

  Guillermo Durán /  Horacio Zeballos def.  Íñigo Cervantes /  Renzo Olivo, 6–1, 6–3

External links
Official Website

Franken Challenge
Franken Challenge
Franken Challenge
Franken Challenge